Semiramisia is a genus of flowering plants belonging to the family Ericaceae.

Its native range is Western South America to Venezuela.

Species
Species:

Semiramisia alata 
Semiramisia karsteniana 
Semiramisia pulcherrima 
Semiramisia speciosa

References

Ericaceae
Ericaceae genera